George Reginald Ward, 1st Viscount Ward of Witley, PC (20 November 1907 – 15 June 1988), styled The Honourable George Ward until 1960, was a British Conservative politician. He served as Secretary of State for Air under Harold Macmillan from 1957 to 1960.

Background and education
Ward was the fourth and youngest son of William Ward, 2nd Earl of Dudley, and Rachel, daughter of Charles Henry Gurney. William Ward, 3rd Earl of Dudley was his eldest brother. He was educated at Eton and Christ Church, Oxford.

Political career
During the Second World War, Ward served as a group captain in the RAF. At the 1945 general election he was elected to the House of Commons to represent Worcester for the Conservative Party, and held the seat until 1960. He served under Winston Churchill and Anthony Eden as Under-Secretary of State for Air from 1952 to 1955 and as Parliamentary and Financial Secretary to the Admiralty from 1955 to 1957. When Harold Macmillan became Prime Minister in January 1957, Ward was appointed Secretary of State for Air, which he remained until October 1960. He was sworn of the Privy Council in 1957 and raised to the peerage as Viscount Ward of Witley, of Great Witley in the County of Worcester, in 1960.

Family
Lord Ward of Whitley married firstly Anne Diana France Aysham Capel, daughter of Boy Capel, in 1940. They had two children: the Hon. Georgina Anne Ward (13 March 1941 – June 2010), an actress of stage and screen, and the Hon. Anthony Giles Humble Ward (10 June 1943 – 4 May 1983), but were divorced in 1951. He married secondly Barbara Mary Colonsay McNeill, daughter of Ronald Frank Rous McNeill and former wife of Michael Astor, in 1962. She died in 1980. Lord Ward of Witley died in June 1988, aged 80. His only son had predeceased him without issue, and as a result his title became extinct on his death.

References

External links 
 

1907 births
1988 deaths
Alumni of Christ Church, Oxford
British Secretaries of State
Conservative Party (UK) MPs for English constituencies
Lords of the Admiralty
Ward, George Reginald
Members of the Privy Council of the United Kingdom
Ministers in the Eden government, 1955–1957
Ministers in the Macmillan and Douglas-Home governments, 1957–1964
Ministers in the third Churchill government, 1951–1955
People educated at Eton College
Royal Air Force group captains
Secretaries of State for Air (UK)
Ward, George Reginald
Ward, George Reginald
Ward, George Reginald
Ward, George Reginald
Ward, George Reginald
UK MPs who were granted peerages
George
Ward, George Reginald
Viscounts created by Elizabeth II